The 33rd Legislative Assembly of Ontario was held from June 4, 1985, until July 31, 1987, just prior to the 1987 general election.

Hugh Alden Edighoffer served as speaker for the assembly.

Twenty-two days into the 33rd Parliament, Premier Frank Miller resigned following the defeat of his Progressive Conservative government in a motion of no confidence. Upon Miller's resignation, Lieutenant Governor John Black Aird appointed David Peterson, then Leader of the Opposition and Leader of the Ontario Liberal Party, as Premier. Peterson went on to form a minority government with the support of the Ontario New Democratic Party.

Notes

References 
Members in Parliament 33

Terms of the Legislative Assembly of Ontario
1985 establishments in Ontario
1987 disestablishments in Ontario